Plexin-A2 is a protein that in humans is coded by the PLXNA2 gene.

This gene encodes a member of the plexin-A family of semaphorin co-receptors. Semaphorins are a large family of secreted or membrane-bound proteins that mediate repulsive effects on axon pathfinding during nervous system development. A subset of semaphorins are recognized by plexin-A/neuropilin transmembrane receptor complexes, triggering a cellular signal transduction cascade that leads to axon repulsion. This plexin-A family member is thought to transduce signals from semaphorin-3A and -3C.

In some studies, the PLXNA2 gene is associated with schizophrenia. and anxiety. PLXNA2 is a candidate gene for intellectual disability and possibly facial dysmorphism and congenital heart disease

References

Further reading